Tomáš Babák (born 28 December 1993) is a Czech handball player for Bergischer HC and the Czech national team.

References

External links

1993 births
Living people
Czech male handball players
People from Jilemnice
Expatriate handball players
Czech expatriate sportspeople in Germany
Czech expatriate sportspeople in Switzerland
Handball-Bundesliga players
Bergischer HC players
Sportspeople from the Liberec Region